Adventures of a Teenage Dragon Slayer, also known as I Was a 7th Grade Dragon Slayer, is a 2010 American adventure comedy family film directed by Andrew Lauer. It stars Lea Thompson, Hunter Allan, Eric Lutes, Richard Sellers, Abby Victor, and Ryan Bradley Norris.

Plot
Branded as a "nerd" and harassed by the school bully, twelve-year-old Arthur is rescued by a magical alchemist troll who holds the secret to defeat an evil dragon, and is soon able to return the favor. Arthur's loving mom Laura, struggling to keep her devious former husband from gaining custody of Arthur, dismisses her son's "fantasies" until she realizes the real and immediate danger. She joins Arthur, the troll, the Knights of the Square Table (Arthur's pals Natalie and Tim) and a dashing fantasy card-game creator named Shane Barker. Together they hope to conquer an unleashed  dragon and the wicked vice-principal who threaten civilization.

Cast
Lea Thompson as Laura
Wendie Malick as Vice Principal Metz
Eric Lutes as Shane Barker
Hunter Allan as Arthur
Amy Pietz as Officer Annie
Abigail Victor as Natalie
Richard Sellers as Bart
Jordan Reynolds as Larry Metz
Ryan Bradley Norris as Tim

References

External links

American fantasy adventure films
Films about dragons
Films about trolls
2010 films
2010s fantasy adventure films
Films directed by Andrew Lauer
2010s English-language films
2010s American films